Phos deforgesi is a species of sea snail, a marine gastropod mollusk in the family Nassariidae, the true whelks.

Description
The length of the shell attains 12.7 mm.

Distribution
This species occurs in the Coral Sea.

References

 Fraussen K. 2003. Three new deep-water species of Phos Montfort, 1810 (Gastropoda: Buccinidae) from the South Pacific. Novapex 4(4): 111-118

External links

Nassariidae
Gastropods described in 2003